Leptophos (O-(4-bromo-2,5-dichlorophenyl) O-methyl phenylphosphonothioate) belongs to the organophosphates and at room temperature it is a stable white solid. It is also known as Phosvel, Abar and Vcs 506. Leptophos was primarily used as a pesticide and fungicide. for rice, cotton, fruit and vegetables until its use was discontinued in 1975 in USA, but still sold in  South-Eastern Asia in 1981.

Leptophos was first discovered to be toxic in 1974 when more than 1000 water buffaloes died after exposure to leptophos in Egypt. In response to this event, the effect of leptophos was investigated on chickens, mice and sheep.

History
In Egypt, leptophos used on cotton in 1971 caused the death of more than 1000 water buffalos and a number of farmers. The compound was never registered for domestic use by the Environmental Protection Agency (EPA) but was exported from the U.S. to at least 30 countries. Leptophos was discontinued for use in late 1975 due to its high toxicity. Between 1971 and 1976 the U.S. used $4 million in United States Agency for International Development funds to ship 13.9 million pounds of leptophos and other banned pesticides to 50 countries. In 1975 U.S. companies alone, exported over 3 million pounds of leptophos.

In 1976, workers in the Velsicol's chemical plant in Bayport, Texas, reported serious neurological symptoms, the Phosvel zombies, and filed a lawsuit against the company.  When Colombia banned leptophos in 1977, the American company Velsicol stopped the production and shipped its Colombian stocks to El Salvador. No prohibitions exist in El Salvador. In other instances Leptophos was imported to Costa Rica via Mexico and Panama, and until 1981 Leptophos was being sold in Indonesia.

Structure and reactivity

It is stable at normal temperatures; at 180 degrees Celsius 85 percent of the material is decomposed in 5 hours, and at 208 degrees Celsius it decomposes in 2 hours.  The main product of thermal decomposition is the S-methyl isomer O-(4-bromo-2,5-chlorophenyl) S-methyl phenylphosphonothioate. Leptophos is hydrolysed slowly under alkaline conditions.  The material is stable toward acid.

In the laboratory, when irradiated with high intensity UV light in the presence of a strong UV sensitizer, leptophos is rapidly converted first to O-(2,5-dichlorophenyl) O-methylphenyl-phosphonothioate, referred to as the dichloro-photoproduct, and then to a material with the empirical formula C13H10ClO2PS (tentatively identified as 3-chloro-6-methoxydibenz [1,2]-oxaphosphorin-6-thione or O-methyl-O,P-(4-chlorobiphenyl-2,6-ylene) phosphonothioate and referred to as the monochloro-photoproduct.  UV light increases the rate of hydrolysis under field conditions.

Synthesis
There are multiple ways to synthesize leptophos. One of the methods that is possible for doing that is to let O-methyl phenylthiophosponyl chloride react with 4-bromo-2,5-dichlorophenol:

C7H8ClOPS + C6H3BrCl2O → C13H10BrCl2O2PS + HCl.

It is also possible to produce it by the reaction of phenylphosphonothioic dichloride with methanol and trimethylamine in toluene follow by a reaction with potassium 4-bromo-2,5-dichlorophenoxide.

Toxicodynamics
Leptophos is an irreversible inhibitor of cholinesterases in vitro. The inhibitory activity of leptophos seems to be related to hydrophobic interactions involving lipophilic groups as phenyl and 4-bromo-2,5-dichlorophenyl and the ability of these groups to donate electrons to firm a complex with the enzyme.

An example of a cholinesterase is the acetylcholinesterase (AChE). This cholinesterase converts the neurotransmitter acetylcholine into the inactive metabolites choline and acetate. Acetylcholine receptors are of two types: 
 A fast-acting ion-channel controlled receptor.
 A slow-acting receptor that acts through a G-protein (guanine nucleotide-binding protein) that stimulates second-messengers (often cyclic AMP) to indirectly open ion-channels.

Direct ion-channel controlling receptors can respond in microseconds, whereas indirect second-messenger controlling receptors take milliseconds to produce a response.

When leptophos binds to the AChE, the acetylcholine does not get inactivated. This interferes with a normal signal transfer. This means that a nerve signal can't get transmitted in the way it should be and leads to a broad range of clinical symptoms.

Metabolism
The main metabolic pathway in of leptophos in rats is an enzymatic hydrolysis of the compound. The main Metabolites are phosphonic acid, 4-bromo-2,3-dichlorophenol, O-methyl O-hydrogen phenylphosphonothioate and methyl hydrogen phenylphosphonate. It is unsure which of the two possible pathways is used to get phosphonic acid.

Absorption and excretion

Following oral administration, leptophos is excreted in urine and faeces as several components. Several components found in urine included: O-methyl phenyl phosphonate (a major component in raturine), O-methyl phenyl phosphonothioic acid (a major component in miceurine), leptophos phenol, and phenyl phosphonic acid. Interspecies differences in metabolism can explain the difference in major metabolites is mice and rats.

Studies in plants indicated that leptophos was slowly absorbed following a foliar treatment with the major quantity found to remain on the leaf surface. Studies with several leaf types (bean - lettuce) showed that residues diminished rapidly on both types of surfaces. The primary mechanism by which leptophos was lost was presumed to be by volatilization. Qualitatively, leptophos was metabolized to products similar to those found with the mouse. Phenyl phosphonate derivatives were also recovered from plant surfaces.

Indications
Leptophos, as well as every other organophosphate, causes acetylcholinesterase inhibition. Because of this inhibition the following symptoms were observed.

Toxicity
Due to the severe toxicity of leptophos, the lethal doses (LD) are determined in animal tests. Toxicity differs between species and between exposure through the skin, inhalation and the gastrointestinal track (table).

References

Acetylcholinesterase inhibitors
Organophosphate insecticides
Chloroarenes
Bromoarenes
Methoxy compounds